El Sabio (The Wise) is a 1980 album by Héctor Lavoe.

Track listing
"El Sabio" (Arreglos musicales por: José Febles) Tito Rodriguez 4:28
"Plazos Traicioneros" (Arreglos musicales por: Alberto García) Luis Marquetti 3:34
"Noche de Farra" (Arreglos musicales por: José Madera) Armando Dewolff 5:59
"Para Ochum" (Arreglos musicales por: Héctor Lavoe) D.R. / D.R.S. 6:33
"Aléjate" (Arreglos musicales por: José Febles) Raúl René Rosado 7:05
"Lloré" (Arreglos musicales por: José Febles) José Febles 6:20
"Ceora" (Arreglos musicales por: José Febles) Lee Morgan 5:45

References

1980 albums
Héctor Lavoe albums
Fania Records albums